Cardonal de Panilonco, or just Panilonco is a Chilean village located north of Pichilemu, Cardenal Caro Province. In 2002, the population was 852 people in 235 households.

Etymology
Panilonco comes from Mapudungun pañil (metal) and lonco (head).

References

Populated places in Pichilemu